Sikkim Public Service Commission, commonly known as SPSC is a state autonomous body commissioned and established by the Government of Sikkim. At the helm of Article 320 of the Constitution of India, it conducts Civil Services examinations and Competitive Examinations for various  civil services and departmental posts under the jurisdiction of Sikkim state.

History 
SPSC came into consideration back into May 1975. When Sikkim state was integrated with the Constitutional Provision under Article 315, the commission was constituted in 1978. During the initial periods, it did not work for four years. When the commission chairman was appointed by the state governor, it started functioning from 1982.

Functions and responsibilities
The commission is amended to function as per the constitution of India and Union Public Service Commission which provides it the state public service commission amendments.
Recruitment to civil services and posts on every year.
Conducting competitive examinations of registered candidates.
Conducting interviews of selected candidates.
Advising to state government on the suitability of officers for appointment on promotion.
Transferring the officers from one service to another.
Heading disciplinary cases under its jurisdiction.

Commission profile
The commission is headed by a Chairman and members for the specific roles. Their term of service and suspension are governed by the Sikkim Public Service Commission (Members) Regulations, Act, 1983.

See also

 List of Public service commissions in India
 Sikkim Public Service Commission Recruitment 2022

References 

Government of Sikkim
Civil Services of India
1975 establishments in Sikkim
Government agencies established in 1975